Gordon Randall Phillip David Garrett (December 16, 1927 – December 31, 1987) was an American science fiction and fantasy author. He was a contributor to Astounding and other science fiction magazines of the 1950s and 1960s. He instructed Robert Silverberg in the techniques of selling large quantities of action-adventure science fiction, and collaborated with him on two novels about men from Earth disrupting a peaceful agrarian civilization on an alien planet.

Biography and writing career

Garrett is best known for the Lord Darcy books — the novel Too Many Magicians and two short story collections — set in an alternate world where a joint Anglo-French empire still led by a Plantagenet dynasty has survived into the twentieth century and where magic works and has been scientifically codified. The Darcy books are rich in jokes, puns, and references (particularly to works of detective and spy fiction: Lord Darcy is modeled on Sherlock Holmes), elements often appearing in the shorter works about the detective. Michael Kurland wrote two additional Lord Darcy novels.

Garrett wrote under a variety of pseudonyms including: David Gordon, John Gordon, Darrel T. Langart (an anagram of his name), Alexander Blade, Richard Greer, Ivar Jorgensen, Clyde Mitchell, Leonard G. Spencer, S. M. Tenneshaw, Gerald Vance. He was also a founding member of the Society for Creative Anachronism, as "Randall of Hightower" (a pun on "garret"). The short novel Brain Twister, written by Garrett with author Laurence Janifer (using the joint pseudonym Mark Phillips), was nominated for the Hugo Award for Best Novel in 1960.

An inveterate punster (defining a pun as "the odor given off by a decaying mind"), he was a favorite guest at science fiction conventions and friend to many fans, especially in Southern California.  According to various anecdotes in a tribute volume, Garrett was cherished by his friends, who often repeated anecdotes of his behavior, but horrified many women, to whom he routinely introduced himself with obscene propositions.<ref name="Best">'Robert Silverberg, ed., 'The Best of Randall Garrett, 1982 Pocket Books </ref>  He introduced himself to Marion Zimmer Bradley with the Latin sentence "Coito ergo sum," (sic) which she didn't understand until it was explained to her some time later as an obscenity, and at another time to a pregnant Anne McCaffrey with "sly innuendoes" which horrified her.  Philip José Farmer recounted an anecdote where Garrett was punched by his then-wife for having a pair of someone else's lace underpants in his pocket, and later ran naked through a hotel after being caught having sex with another woman in the wrong room.  Frank Herbert said "You could follow his movements around this creative Anachronists' picnic by the squeals of the women whose bottoms he had just pinched."  Isaac Asimov referred to Garrett's offending Judith Merril enough, she emptied an ashtray over his and Garrett's heads.

Garrett was married to fellow author Vicki Ann Heydron, who largely wrote the Gandalara Cycle fantasy series credited to both spouses; they met in 1975, at the home of their mutual agent, and were married in December 1978. In 1986, Heydron specified that she had been Garrett's third wife "and at least his sixth collaborator".

In 1999, Randall Garrett was posthumously awarded the Sidewise Award for Alternate History Special Achievement Award for the Lord Darcy series. He was also ordained in the Old Catholic Church. Glen Cook's private detective character Garrett P.I. is named in honor of Garrett.

Health
In the summer of 1979, Garrett contracted a viral infection which led to meningitis and/or encephalitis, and, subsequently, severe amnesia.  Hoping that his condition was temporary, Heydron served as his caregiver for two years, but in August 1981, "for the sake of his health and [her own] sanity, [...] allowed him to be hospitalized."

In The Best of Randall Garrett, a combined anthology and festschrift which was published in January 1982, editor Robert Silverberg (a personal friend of Garrett's) stated that although the infection "for a time threatened [Garrett's] life and for a much longer time has made it impossible for him to work", Garrett was "fighting his way back to full recovery"  — and, indeed, when Algis Budrys reviewed the anthology in the August 1982 issue of the Magazine of Fantasy and Science Fiction, he stated that he had been told that "when last seen, Garrett was seated at a dinner table, cheerfully ignoring the assembled company and attempting to remember the words to a dirty song"; however, in October 1982, Dave Langford reported that the Hugo Award ceremony at that year's Worldcon had included an announcement that Garrett "had permanently lost his memory". By 1986, the "about the authors" text in the novel The River Wall, credited to Garrett and Heydron, described Garrett as having suffered "serious and permanent injury", and in 2011, Langford and Brian M. Stableford's entry on Garrett in The Encyclopedia of Science Fiction summarized him as having been "hospitalized from 1981 until his death" in 1987.

Bibliography

Gandalara Cycle
By Garrett and his wife Vicki Ann Heydron; written by Heydron from a draft of the first volume and an outline of the series by Garrett.
 The Steel of Raithskar (1981)
 The Glass of Dyskornis (1982)
 The Bronze of Eddarta (1983)
 The Well of Darkness (1983)
 The Search for Kä (1984)
 Return to Eddarta (1985)
 The River Wall (1986) 
 The Gandalara Cycle I (1986), omnibus of #1-3 above
 The Gandalara Cycle II (1986), omnibus of #4-6 above

Lord Darcy series
 Murder and Magic (1979), collection of 1964–1973 stories
 Too Many Magicians (1966), magazine serialization 1966
 Lord Darcy Investigates (1981), collection of 1974–1979 stories
 Lord Darcy (1983), omnibus containing all three books above. The 2002 edition adds two previously  uncollected stories, with minor editing to remove repetitions of the backstory.

Nidorian series
With Robert Silverberg, as Robert Randall.
 The Shrouded Planet (1957)
 The Dawning Light (1959)

Collections
 Takeoff! (1980), composed of tongue-in-cheek imitations of a number of other authors and universes, such as E.E. "Doc" Smith's Lensman series and Reginald Bretnor's Ferdinand Feghoot (who is "Benedict Breadfruit" in Garrett's treatment).

Short stories

 "The Hunting Lodge" (1954) 
 "The Best Policy" (1957) also as David Gordon. A smart Earthling is abducted by a reconnaissance group of hostile aliens, but convinces them that Earthlings are a far more advanced and superior race, so they end up sending humble ambassadors instead of conquering the planet. The catch is these aliens have a perfect truth detector, so the hero has to phrase his every comment very carefully so that he can pull off such a huge lie while being literally honest.
 "The Queen Bee" (1958)
 "Backward, Turn Backward" (1959)
 "Despoilers of the Golden Empire" (1959)
 "But, I Don't Think" (1959)

The collection Takeoff Too included a poem, which the editor titled "The Egyptian Diamond", which was erroneously credited to Garrett. It was actually written by Jack Bennett and originally published under the title "Ben Ali the Egyptian". Parts of "Ben Ali the Egyptian" were'' quoted in Garrett's short story "The Foreign Hand Tie."

References

External links
 
 Bibliography on SciFan
 
 
 

1927 births
1987 deaths
20th-century American male writers
20th-century American novelists
20th-century American short story writers
American Old Catholics
American fantasy writers
American male novelists
American male short story writers
American science fiction writers
Analog Science Fiction and Fact people
Place of birth missing
Place of death missing
Sidewise Award winners